Leonard Schoonmaker (March 27, 1882 – May 30, 1950) was an American fencer. He competed in the individual foil and épée events at the 1920 Summer Olympics.

See also
List of Princeton University Olympians

References

External links
 

1882 births
1950 deaths
American male foil fencers
Olympic fencers of the United States
Fencers at the 1920 Summer Olympics
People from Little Falls, New Jersey
Sportspeople from Passaic County, New Jersey
American male épée fencers